Blaine B. Campbell (born March 28, 1940) is an American politician and a Republican member of the South Dakota House of Representatives representing District 35 since January 11, 2013.

Elections
2012 When incumbent Republican Representative Mark Kirkeby ran for South Dakota Senate and left a District 35 seat open, Campbell ran in the three-way June 5, 2012 Republican Primary and placed second with 486 votes (33.0%); in the four-way November 6, 2012 General election, incumbent Republican Representative Don Kopp took the first seat and Campbell took the second seat with 3,379 votes (27.18%) ahead of Democratic nominee Shane Liebig (who had run for Senate in 2008) and Jay Pond (who had run for the seat in 2010).

References

External links
Official page at the South Dakota Legislature
 

Place of birth missing (living people)
Living people
Republican Party members of the South Dakota House of Representatives
Politicians from Rapid City, South Dakota
1940 births
21st-century American politicians